Play It As It Lays is a 1972 American drama film directed by Frank Perry and written by Joan Didion and John Gregory Dunne, based on the novel of the same name by Didion. The film stars Tuesday Weld and Anthony Perkins, who previously starred together in the 1968 film Pretty Poison.

Plot 
Former model Maria Wyeth, who comes from a Nevada town with a population of 28, is now a successful actress. Unhappily married to, and separated from, temperamental producer Carter Lang, she is also chronically depressed and institutionalized.

Reflecting back on what brought her to the asylum, Maria recalls driving around Los Angeles in her yellow Chevrolet Corvette and spending time with her closest friend, B.Z. Mendenhall, an unhappy man who is gay. Maria has a brain-damaged daughter, Kate, who is being kept in a sanitarium at the insistence of Carter, who resents Maria’s visiting the girl so frequently. Maria's secret desire is to live somewhere with Kate and find some kind of joy in life together.

Maria has been having an affair with Les Goodwin, a screenwriter. When she tells Carter that she’s pregnant with Goodwin’s child, he demands that she get an abortion. Maria goes to Las Vegas and has a fling with a mob-connected lawyer, Larry Kulik. She later returns to L.A. and has a one-night stand with Johnny Waters, a television star who needs to watch his own show on TV in order to get in the mood for sex.

Bored and depressed, Maria steals Johnny's car and speeds off. When she is stopped by police, drugs are found in the car and she is placed under arrest. With her spirits at an all-time low, Maria returns to Las Vegas and finds that B.Z. is equally unhappy. When B.Z. swallows a handful of pills and washes them down with vodka, Maria, rather than calling for help, cradles him and watches him die.

Back at the asylum, a psychiatrist asks Maria why she keeps on playing when she knows what “nothing” (nihilism) really means. She replies, "Why not?"

Cast 

 Tuesday Weld as Maria Wyeth Lang 
 Anthony Perkins as B.Z. Mendenhall
 Tammy Grimes as Helene
 Adam Roarke as Carter Lang
 Ruth Ford as Carlotta
 Eddie Firestone as Benny Austin
 Diana Ewing as Susannah
 Paul Lambert as Larry Kulik
 Chuck McCann as Abortionist's Assistant
 Severn Darden as Hypnotist
 Tony Young as Johnny Waters
 Richard Anderson as Les Goodwin
 Elizabeth Claman as The Chickie
 Mitzi Hoag as Patsy
 Tyne Daly as Journalist
 Jennifer C. Lesko as Kate (uncredited)
 Roger Ewing as Nelson
 Richard Ryal as Apartment Manager
 John P. Finnegan as Frank
 Tracy Morgan as Jeanelle
 Darlene Conley as Kate's Nurse
 Arthur Knight as himself
 Albert Johnson as himself
 Allan Warnick as TV Panelist

Reception 
Roger Ebert of the Chicago Sun-Times gave the film four stars and praised the two leads' performances: "What makes the movie work so well on this difficult ground is, happily, easy to say: It has been well-written and directed, and Tuesday Weld and Anthony Perkins are perfectly cast as Maria and her friend B.Z. The material is so thin (and has to be) that the actors have to bring the human texture along with them. They do, and they make us care about characters who have given up caring for themselves."

Molly Haskell of The Village Voice was less enthusiastic, stating that she had "a hard time remembering [the film]."

Vincent Canby of The New York Times found the screenplay and direction "banal," but effused praise for the performances of Weld and Perkins. "The film is beautifully performed by Tuesday Weld as Maria and Anthony Perkins as B.Z., but the whole thing has turned soft," Canby writes.

Critic John Simon wrote Play it as it Lays "...is a very bad movie."

Tuesday Weld was nominated for a 1972 Golden Globe Award for Best Motion Picture Actress in a Drama.

References

External links 
 
 

1972 films
1972 drama films
1972 LGBT-related films
American drama films
American LGBT-related films
Films about abortion
Films about actors
Films about Hollywood, Los Angeles
Films about psychiatry
Films about suicide
Films based on American novels
Films directed by Frank Perry
Universal Pictures films
1970s English-language films
1970s American films